The Associated Press Service (APS) is a Pakistani, multinational independent news agency headquartered in Islamabad. The APS is owned by its contributing newspapers, radio, and television stations in Pakistan. APS is working under Press and Publications Ordinance, 2002 in Islamabad/Rawalpindi Pakistan. Journalist Chaudhry Ahsan Premee is the editor-in-chief.

At the time of its establishment in 2007, news collected by the APS was published and republished by more than 500 newspapers, in addition to more than 35 television and radio broadcasters. The APS operates 25 news bureaus worldwide.

References

External links
 
 Official Facebook page

News agencies based in Pakistan